Phacelia distans is a species of flowering plant in the borage family, Boraginaceae, known by the common names distant phacelia and distant scorpionweed. It is native to the southwestern United States and northwestern Mexico, where it grows in many types of habitat, including forest, woodland, chaparral, grassland, and meadows.

Description
Phacelia distans is a variable annual herb growing decumbent to erect, its branching or unbranched stem 15 to 80 centimeters in length. It is usually glandular and coated in soft or stiff hairs. The leaves are up to 10 to 15 centimeters long and are divided into several lobed leaflets, sometimes intricately. The hairy, glandular inflorescence is a one-sided curving or coiling cyme of many funnel- or bell-shaped flowers. The flower is just under a centimeter long and may be white or varying shades of blue or purple.

References

External links

Phacelia distans. CalPhotos.

distans
Flora of California
Flora of Nevada
Flora of Northwestern Mexico
Flora of the California desert regions
Flora of the Klamath Mountains
Flora of the Sierra Nevada (United States)
Natural history of the California chaparral and woodlands
Natural history of the California Coast Ranges
Natural history of the Central Valley (California)
Natural history of the Colorado Desert
Natural history of the Mojave Desert
Natural history of the Peninsular Ranges
Natural history of the San Francisco Bay Area
Natural history of the Transverse Ranges